The Kaye effect is a property of complex liquids which was first described by the British engineer Alan Kaye in 1963.

While pouring one viscous mixture of an organic liquid onto a surface, the surface suddenly spouted an upcoming jet of liquid which merged with the downgoing one.

This phenomenon has since been discovered to be common in many non-Newtonian liquids (liquids with a shear stress dependent viscosity or viscoelastic properties). Common household liquids in this category are liquid hand soaps, shampoos and non-drip paint. The effect usually goes unnoticed, however, because it seldom lasts more than about 300 milliseconds. The effect can be sustained by pouring the liquid onto a slanted surface, preventing the outgoing jet from intersecting the downward one (which tends to end the effect).

Whilst it was long thought to occur due to a shear-thinning slip layer, recent studies have shown through high-speed videos and experiments in a vacuum chamber that an extremely thin layer of air (approximately 1000 times thinner than the jet diameter) is entrained, which acts as a lubricant and supports the sliding jet.

The current theory is that viscoelasticity is key. In a jet viscoelastic fluid, a portion of the energy of deformation as the jet falls is recoverable, and this reduces the force required to support the leaping jet, enabling more air to be entrained.

References

External links

Bizarre liquid jets explained - the Kaye effect
Puzzle of Leaping Liquid Solved.
The Kaye effect using shampoo.
The Kaye effect shot through a high speed camera.

1963 in science
Rheology